The 1964–65 Montreal Canadiens season was the 56th season of play of the club. The Canadiens won the Stanley Cup for the first time in five seasons, and the 13th time in franchise history, by defeating the Chicago Black Hawks in the final.

Regular season

Final standings

Record vs. opponents

Schedule and results

Playoffs

Stanley Cup finals

Like the 1955 finals, every game was won by the home team. Gump Worsley made his first finals appearance after 12 years in the league and recorded two shutouts, including the one in game seven. Jean Beliveau was the inaugural winner of the Conn Smythe Trophy as playoff MVP, scoring eight goals and eight assists in thirteen games.

Chicago Black Hawks vs. Montreal Canadiens

Montreal wins Stanley Cup four games to three.

Jean Beliveau wins first Conn Smythe Trophy.

Player statistics

Regular season
Scoring

Goaltending

Playoffs
Scoring

Goaltending

Awards and records
 Jean Beliveau, inaugural winner, Conn Smythe Trophy.

Transactions

Draft picks

See also
 1964–65 NHL season
 List of Stanley Cup champions

References

External links
Canadiens on Hockey Database
Canadiens on NHL Reference

Stanley Cup championship seasons
Montreal Canadiens seasons
Mon
Mon
1960s in Montreal
1964 in Quebec
1965 in Quebec